The Ford Falcon (FG X) is a full-size car that was produced by Ford Australia. Introduced in 2014, it is a restyled second and final iteration of the seventh generation Falcon FG. While external and drive train changes were significant, the interior was carried over from the 2008-2014 FG model. This was the last locally produced model by Ford Australia.

Naming 
Internally known as project 201X, Ford Australia revealed its last Falcon in August 2014 and explained that its series code, "FG X", was chosen following significant feedback from key enthusiasts. The new code, like the preceding FG, pays homage to the Fairmont Ghia nameplates of past generations whereas the X alludes to Falcon's most popular series, from the XK to the XH.

Model range 

The FG X was officially launched in December 2014 and was offered in both sedan and utility body styles.

The sedan is sold in eight variants comprising:
 Falcon
 Falcon G6E
 Falcon G6E Turbo
 Falcon XR6
 Falcon XR6 Turbo
 Falcon XR8
 Falcon XR6 Sprint
 Falcon XR8 Sprint

The latter nameplate returned after being absent from the Falcon range since June 2010. All XR variants have the option of manual or automatic transmissions, while the Falcon and G6E/G6ET were sold with a 6 speed automatic transmission only.

The utility range included the base Ute (replacing the previous XL), XR6 and XR6 Turbo only—each with the option of cab chassis or utility (style side box) bodies. The Falcon utility ended production on 29 July 2016.

The G6, which was introduced with the FG series in 2008 to replace the Fairmont badge, was discontinued and, unlike past series, the XR8 sedan was not complemented by a utility version.

This Falcon range is the first Australian-made vehicle to feature Wi-Fi connectivity and DAB+ radio courtesy of its upgraded in-car entertainment and command system, now marketed as "SYNC2". The system also features voice control and emergency call functionality.

Engines 
The Ford Falcon FG X is available with the following engines:
 2.0-litre inline-four turbocharged: 
 4.0-litre inline-six: 
 4.0-litre inline-six lpg (EcoLPI): 

Successor 
Come October 2016, due to Ford Motor Company's "One Ford" product development plan introduced in 2008 to rationalise its global range, the Falcon will not be directly replaced by a similarly sized vehicle, such as the much-speculated North American Taurus, due to an unsuccessful previous attempt to sell the third-generation model on the Australian market in the 1990s. Instead, Ford Australia will offer the fourth-generation Mondeo from Europe and the sixth-generation Mustang, the latter as part of Ford's efforts to boost sales of the Mustang brand worldwide and still give Ford Australia a halo car to replace the Falcon XR and Falcon GT V8 range.

The Ford Falcon was labeled as 'inextricably linked to Australian Heritage' by the former CEO of Ford Australia (Bob Graziano). Although Ford has sourced the Mustang and the Fusion/Mondeo, they have no plans to bring in a direct replacement for the Falcon. Ford retired the Falcon name on 7 October 2016 after 56 years of production, therefore, making it the longest running name plate in the history of Ford.

Sales 

Sales of the FG X Falcon (and the SZ II Territory) commenced in December 2014. Sales exceeded 700 monthly sales vehicles for the first time in March 2015. 

The FG X Falcon was produced from October 2014 until the end of Ford vehicle production in Australia in October 2016. During this time, it only sold a little over 11,100 units. Including Utility sales made throughout the same duration, this would bring the tally to approximately 16,100.

The six cylinder models were used briefly by police in Western Australia as a general policing vehicle.

References

External links 

Ford Australia 

FG X Falcon
FG X
Cars introduced in 2014
Cars of Australia
Full-size vehicles
Coupé utilities
Rear-wheel-drive vehicles
Sedans
2010s cars